False Witness, also known as The Diplomat internationally, is a two-part Australian television mini-series, produced by Screentime Australia, and broadcast simultaneously on the Australian subscription television channel UK.TV and BBC HD. Commissioned as part of its required drama output, False Witness was the third in a series of drama commissions by the network in 2008, following Make or Break and Supernova.

Inspired by real events, The Diplomat stars Dougray Scott as Ian Porter, a British diplomat to Tajikistan, who comes under scrutiny from Scotland Yard whilst trying to prevent the sale of a nuclear bomb formerly belonging to the Soviet Union.

The series premiered in Australia on 11 January 2009, with the second episode broadcast the following night. The series also broadcast in the United States on iOn as a four-hour event on 17 January 2009. Despite being co-produced by the BBC, the series was never broadcast on terrestrial television in the United Kingdom, instead being made available on DVD on 14 March 2011 via Showbox Entertainment. The series was, however, broadcast on True Entertainment.

Cast
 Dougray Scott as Ian Porter
 Rachael Blake as Detective Chief Inspector Julie Hales
 Jeremy Lindsay Taylor as Mark Wilson
 Richard Roxburgh as Charles Van Koors
 Claire Forlani as Pippa Porter
 Don Hany as Sergei Krousov
 Jonny Pasvolsky as Antonio Morelli
 Tony Martin as Bill Murray
 Socratis Otto as Shannon Cross
 Stephen Curry as Detective Sergeant Neil Trent
 Alex Menglet as Dimitri
 Shane Briant as Winston Beale
 Costa Ronin as Vladimir

Episodes

References

External links
 
 

2000s Australian television miniseries
2009 Australian television series debuts
2009 Australian television series endings